Natalyinka is a rural locality (a village) in Lavrovskoye Rural Settlement, Sudogodsky District, Vladimir Oblast, Russia. The population was 12 as of 2010.

Geography 
Natalyinka is located 19 km northwest of Sudogda (the district's administrative centre) by road. Aksenovo is the nearest rural locality.

References 

Rural localities in Sudogodsky District